National Taiwan University (NTU) is a public research university in Taipei, Taiwan. 

The university was founded in 1928 during Japanese rule as the seventh of the Imperial Universities. It was named Taihoku Imperial University and served during the period of Japanese colonization. After World War II, the Nationalist Kuomintang (KMT) government assumed the administration of the university. The Ministry of Education reorganized and renamed the university to its current name on November 15, 1945, with its roots of liberal tradition from Peking University in Beijing by former NTU President Fu Ssu-nien. The university consists of 11 colleges, 56 departments, 133 graduate institutes, about 60 research centers, and a school of professional education and continuing studies.

Notable alumni include Tsai Ing-Wen, current President of the Republic of China, former presidents Lee Teng-hui, Chen Shui-bian and Ma Ying-jeou, Turing Award laureate Andrew Yao, and Nobel Prize in Chemistry laureate Yuan T. Lee. NTU is affiliated with National Taiwan Normal University and National Taiwan University of Science and Technology as part of the NTU System.

History

Imperial University 
National Taiwan University has its origins in 臺北帝國大學 Taihoku Imperial University (Taihoku Teikoku Daigaku), founded in 1928 during Japanese rule as a member of the imperial university system administered by the Empire of Japan.

Taihoku Imperial University began with the faculty of Liberal Arts and Law and the Faculty of Science and Agriculture serving 60 students. The university was intended mainly for Japanese nationals; few Taiwanese students were admitted. The Faculty of Medicine and the Faculty of Engineering were added in 1935 and 1943, respectively.

National University 
After World War II, the Republic of China (Taiwan) government reorganized the school as an institution for Chinese-speaking students. The school was renamed National Taiwan University on 15 November 1945 and Lo Tsung-lo was appointed as its president. The Literature and Politics division was divided into the College of Liberal Arts and the College of Law. Additionally, colleges of Science, Medicine, Engineering, and Agriculture were established. Initially, there were six colleges with 22 departments. In 1945, student enrollment was 585.

In 1960, the night school was initiated on a trial basis, and in 1967 a new night school was established. In 1987, the College of Management was established, followed by the College of Public Health in 1993 and the College of Electrical Engineering in 1997. The College of Electrical Engineering was later reorganized as the College of Computer Science and Electrical Engineering. In 1999, the College of Law has renamed the College of Social Sciences, and the Night Division and the Center for Continuing Education were combined to form the School for Professional and Continuing Studies. In 2002, the College of Agriculture has renamed the College of Bio-resources and Agriculture, and in 2002 a College of Life Sciences was added.

NTU selected as the national seven universities in research in 2002 (currently merged into six universities).

Kuan Chung-ming Controversy
Kuan Chung-ming, an economist who previously served in the Ma Administration, was named university president-elect in January 2018 but soon became embroiled in allegations related to plagiarism, academic misconduct, and violations of civil code which stipulated that Taiwanese public servants were not permitted to deliver lectures or to be involved in any mainland China-related academic activities due to national security concerns. During the election and the subsequent investigation, Tei-Wei Kuo served as the interim president of the university while the president-elect underwent multiple legal investigations from the ruling DPP government. Though Kuan was eventually cleared of all accusations and officially named as the university president in January 2019 (see ), this prolonged investigation raised suspicion regarding the intervention from the ruling DPP government. Three Ministers of Education stepped down as a result of this event.

Campuses 
NTU has a main campus in Daan District, Taipei City and has additional campuses in Taipei, New Taipei City, Hsinchu County, Yunlin County, and Nantou County. The main campus is home to most college department buildings and administrative buildings. The university governs farms, forests, and hospitals for education and research purposes.

The five campuses are:
Main Campus (113 hectares, located in Daan District, Taipei)
Shuiyuan Campus (7.7 hectares, located in Zhongzheng District, Taipei)
College of Medicine Campus (located in Zhongzheng District)
Yunlin Campus (54 hectares, located in Yunlin County)
Zhubei Campus (22 hectares, located in Hsinchu County)

Other university property 
Visiting professor residences (34 hectares, located on Yangmingshan, Taipei)
University Farm (19.5 hectares, located in Xindian District, New Taipei City)
Wenshan Botanical Garden (5 hectares, located in Shiding District, New Taipei City)
Highland Experimental Farm (1,019 hectares, located in Nantou County)
Experimental Forest Office (25.9 hectares, located in Nantou County)
Experimental Forest (33,310 hectares, located in Nantou County)

Academics 

The university comprises 11 colleges: Liberal Arts, Engineering, Science, Social Sciences, Law, Bio-Resources & Agriculture, Management, Public Health, Electrical Engineering & Computer Science, Medicine, and Life Science. NTU offers bachelor's degrees, master's degrees, and doctorate degrees in many disciplines.

NTU requires most of its undergraduate students to take a mandatory core curriculum, comprising Chinese, freshman English, physical education, and public service. The medical school in addition dictates each of its students to take philosophy and sociology classes as well as seminars in ethics and thanatology. Military training is no longer an obligatory course for male students, but it is a prerequisite if they plan to apply to become officers during their compulsory military service.

NTU's programs cover a wide array of disciplines across science, arts, and the humanities, with up to 8,000 courses made available for selection each semester. Students are able to select courses offered by any of the colleges; however, compulsory subjects designated for each major needs to be completed to be awarded a degree. A student must declare a major during college application, some majors are more competitive than others and require a higher national examination score. In recent years, medicine, electrical engineering, law, and finance have been the most selective majors. Most majors take four years to complete while both the dental and the medical degrees take six years to finish.

The International Chinese Language Program (ICLP), founded by Stanford University, is located at National Taiwan University.

NTU is a member of the Association of Pacific Rim Universities, Washington University in St. Louis's McDonnell International Scholars Academy, and the Association of East Asian Research Universities.

NTU also participates in several programs of the Taiwan International Graduate Program of Academia Sinica, Taiwan's most preeminent academic research institution.

University rankings 

National Taiwan University is widely considered to be the best university in Taiwan. NTU was ranked 77th worldwide in the QS World University Rankings 2023, 187th worldwide in the Times Higher Education World University Rankings 2023, 203rd worldwide in the US News 2022-2023, and 201-300th worldwide in the ARWU 2022. With other peering references of academic ranking, NTU also releases NTU World Universities ranking annually on the Double Ten Day, the National Holiday of the Republic of China.

The Aggregate Ranking of Top Universities (ARTU), which sorts universities based on their aggregate performance across THE, QS, and ARWU, ranked NTU 135th worldwide in 2022. 

The individual subject rankings from QS rankings in 2022 were: 24th in Classic and Ancient History, 36th in Modern languages, 38th in Civil and Structural Engineering, 42nd in Linguistic, 46th in Medicine, 47th in Nursing, 48th in Electrical and Electronic Engineering, and 50th in Material Science.

List of presidents 
The president heads the university. Each college is headed by a dean and each department by a chairman. Students elect their own representatives each year to attend administrative meetings.

National Taiwan University
Chen Wen-chang: 8 January 2023 - present
Kuan Chung-ming: 8 January 2019 - 7 January 2023
 (interim): October 2017 – January 2019
: June 2013 – June 2017
Lee Si-chen : August 2005 – June 2013
Chen Wei-jao: 22 June 1993 – June 2005
: March 1993 – June 1993
: August 1984 – February 1993
: August 1981 – July 1984
Yen Cheng-hsing: June 1970 – July 1981
Chien Szu-liang: January 1951 – May 1970
: December 1950 – January 1951
Fu Szu-nien: January 1949 – December 1950
: June 1948 – December 1948
Lu Chih-houng: August 1946 – May 1948
Lo Tsung-lo: August 1945 – July 1946

Taihoku Imperial University
Kazuo Ando (安藤一雄): March 1945 – August 1945
: April 1941 – March 1945
: September 1937 – April 1941
: March 1928 – September 1937

Alumni 

NTU has produced many notable alumni. Tsai Ing-Wen, the current President of the Republic of China (Taiwan), as well as former presidents Lee Teng-hui, Chen Shui-bian and Ma Ying-jeou, all graduated from NTU. Both Nobel Prize in Chemistry laureate Yuan T. Lee and Turing Award laureate Andrew Yao received their Bachelor of Science from the university. Many NTU electrical engineering graduates have gone on to build global companies, including Quanta Computer's Barry Lam, Mediatek's Tsai Ming-kai and Garmin's Min Kao.

Notes

See also 

National Taiwan University Hospital
List of universities in Taiwan
Education in Taiwan

Alliance
EUTW university alliance

References

External links 

 Official website in English

 
Educational institutions established in 1928
Universities and colleges in Taipei
1928 establishments in Taiwan
Comprehensive universities in Taiwan